Eric Santos (born 31 January 1972), is an Angolan-Portuguese actor and writer. He is best known for the roles in the films Scoundrel, The Compass, Jikulumessu and Kaminey.

Career
Santos started his career in 1996 with the television serial Praça da Alegria. Since then he has participated in plays, films, series, soap operas in both Angola and Portuguese. 

He is the founder and CEO of 'Cast 39', a Talent Agency based in Portugal.

Filmography

References

External links
 

Living people
Portuguese film actors
Angolan writers
Angolan male actors
1972 births